Allison is an unincorporated community in Nodaway County, in the U.S. state of Missouri.

History
A post office called Allison was established in 1883, and remained in operation until 1901. The community has the name of an early settler.

References

Unincorporated communities in Nodaway County, Missouri
Unincorporated communities in Missouri